Kendig C. Bare (November 5, 1913 — January 12, 1989) was an American politician.

Career
As a youth, Kendig was involved in the Order of DeMolay, serving as an officer for Lancaster Chapter in 1932 and as chairman of the 1934 Conclave of the Associated Chapters of the Order of DeMolay in Pennsylvania. At that Conclave, he was elected state master councillor of Pennsylvania DeMolay, serving a one-year term. During his tenure, Bare began publication of the Keystone Crusader, a newsletter for all members of DeMolay in Pennsylvania. The Keystone Crusader remains in publication to this day.

Bare was the 31st mayor of Lancaster, Pennsylvania from 1950 until 1958, except for an eight-month period (1950–1951) when he was called into military service in the Korean War. During Kendig's absence, his brother Howard Bare assumed the duties of mayor.

In honor of Bare, the City of Lancaster named the Public Safety building in his honor, however this facility is no longer in use.

References

Biography of KC Bare

1913 births
1989 deaths
Mayors of Lancaster, Pennsylvania
American military personnel of the Korean War
20th-century American politicians